Anne Hamilton, Duchess of Hamilton (1720 – 9 March 1771) formerly Anne Spencer, was the third wife of James Hamilton, 5th Duke of Hamilton.

Life 
She was the daughter of Edward Spencer of Rendlesham, Suffolk, where she was born. Thus she was the sister of Elizabeth Spencer, later the wife of Sir James Dashwood, 2nd Baronet, and the aunt of the future Anne Stewart, Countess of Galloway.

His second wife having died in 1729, the duke married Anne Spencer on 21 August 1737. They had three children:

Lady Anne Hamilton (1738–1780), who married Arthur Chichester, 1st Marquess of Donegall, and had children
Archibald Hamilton, 9th Duke of Hamilton (1740–1819)
Lord Spencer Hamilton (1742–1789) who died unmarried in Paris. An alternative death date of 1791 is also recorded.

The duke died in 1743, aged 40, and was initially succeeded by James, his 21-year-old son from his first marriage. The duchess remarried on 24 December 1751, her second husband being Richard Savage Nassau, a son of Frederick Nassau de Zuylestein, 3rd Earl of Rochford. She retained the status of dowager duchess.

They had three children:

Lucy Nassau de Zuylestein (1752–1830), who died unmarried
William Henry Nassau de Zuylestein, 5th Earl of Rochford (1754–1830), who died unmarried
George Richard Savage Nassau (1756–1823), who died unmarried

The duchess died in 1771 and was buried at Easton, Suffolk, under the terms of her will. The Spencer family estates passed to her elder son, Archibald, who later inherited the dukedom from the son of his half-brother.

References

1720 births
1771 deaths
British duchesses by marriage
Peerage of Scotland